Thalamegos (plural: Thalamegoi) was a type of houseboat, yacht, or barge mainly found in the Nile river, Egypt. They are used as freight carriers and ferry. The most famous and largest thalamegos is a huge twin-hulled catamaran, a two-story Nile river palace barge that was commissioned by Hellenistic king Ptolemy IV Philopator for himself and his wife Arsinoe III ca. 200 BCE.

Etymology 

Description and role 
Due to the popularity of Ptolemy IV's thalamegos, they are usually described as palace barges or floating palaces. Callegaro pointed out that the name refers to a type of barge of that time. Appian recorded that Ptolemy II Philadelphus possessed 800 thalamegos which can be used for military service. Some are used for cruising the Nile for government business and religious ceremonies. Also existed thalamegos configured as pleasure-craft and cargo carriers.

Ptolemy IV's thalamegos 
Callixenus of Rhodes described Philopator's vessel in his Peri Alexandreias:The Thalamegos had the length of half a stadium, and width by the widest part of 30 cubits. Its height, including the structure of the pavilion, reached almost 40 cubits. […] Its form resembled neither warships nor merchant ships but had been altered to suit the depths of the river. Thus, the lower part was shallow and wide and instead was high in height. The upper parts, and especially that of the bow, stretched considerably, and its curvature was well traced. It had a double bow and a double stern, and it rose to the top because in the river the waves often rise very high.

In its intermediate cavity were built the banquet halls, the bedrooms, and everything else that is needed for daily life. […] Near the bow one came upon a chamber devoted to Dionysos; it contained thirteen couches and was surrounded by a row of columns. It had a cornice that was gilded as far as the surrounding architrave; the ceiling was decorated in accordance with the spirit of the god. In this room, on the right-hand side, a recess was built, which was entirely covered with real gold and precious stones so that it looked like a stone wall.

See also 
List of world's largest wooden ships
Nemi ships
Caligula's Giant Ship
Isis (ship)
Baochuan
Jong (ship)

References

Bibliography 

Barges
Royal and presidential yachts
Ancient Egyptian ships